Thomas L. Sherer (born November 11, 1948) is an American politician in the state of Alabama. He served in the Alabama House of Representatives from 2002 to 2010.

References

Alabama Democrats
1948 births
Living people
People from Jasper, Alabama
Jacksonville State University alumni
University of Alabama at Birmingham alumni
Samford University alumni